Deepika Rasangika (born 13 December 1983) is a Sri Lankan cricketer who now plays for the Bahrain women's cricket team.

Rasangika played in more than 60 matches for the Sri Lanka women's cricket team from 2008 to 2014. She was named in Sri Lanka's squad for the 2009 Women's Cricket World Cup.

In March 2022, she was named in Bahrain's squad for the 2022 GCC Women's Gulf Cup in Oman. She made her Women's Twenty20 International (WT20I) debut for Bahrain against Oman, in the opening match of that tournament. On 22 March 2022, in Bahrain's match against Saudi Arabia, Rasangika scored 161 not out. She became the first cricketer for Bahrain to score a century in WT20Is, and her total was the highest individual score in a WT20I match.

References

1983 births
Living people
Sri Lankan women cricketers
Sri Lanka women One Day International cricketers
Sri Lanka women Twenty20 International cricketers
Bahraini women cricketers
Bahrain women Twenty20 International cricketers
Cricketers from Colombo
Sri Lankan emigrants to Bahrain
Sri Lankan expatriates in Bahrain
Dual international cricketers